Prensa Libre may refer to:

 La Prensa Libre, a Costa Rican newspaper founded in 1889
 Prensa Libre (Cuba), a Cuban newspaper founded in 1941
 Prensa Libre (Guatemala), a Guatemalan newspaper founded in 1951

See also
 La Prensa (disambiguation)